Serebryanye Prudy (lit. Silver Ponds) is an urban locality (a work settlement) and the administrative center of Serebryano-Prudsky District of Moscow Oblast, Russia, located on the Osyotr River. Among the district centers of Moscow Oblast, it is the southernmost, and the farthest from Moscow. Population: 

Serebryanye Prudy stands on the M6 highway (Moscow–Astrakhan) and the Moscow–Volgograd railway.

Serebryanye Prudy was first mentioned in a chronicle in 1571. Under the Russian Empire, it was a village of Venyovsky Uyezd of Tula Governorate. It became a district center in 1924. In 1929, Serebryanye Prudy was transferred to the Central Industrial Oblast which in September 1937 was split, with the village finding itself again in Tula Oblast, only to be included into Moscow Oblast in 1942. It was granted urban-type settlement status in 1961.

Hero of the Soviet Union Vasily Chuikov was born here in 1900.

Postal code: 142970. Dialing code: +7 49667.

References

Urban-type settlements in Moscow Oblast
Vyatichi
Venyovsky Uyezd